Blood donation occurs when an individual voluntarily has blood drawn, usually for a blood transfusion to another person.

Give blood may also refer to:
Give Blood (Bane album), a 2001 album by former American band Bane
Give Blood (Brakes album), a 2005 album by the British band Brakes
"Give Blood" (song), a 1986 song by Pete Townshend